Cyrtodactylus zugi is a species of gecko, a lizard in the family Gekkonidae. The species is endemic to Batanta and Waigeo Islands in Indonesia.

Etymology
The specific name, zugi, is in honor of American herpetologist George R. Zug.

Habitat
The preferred natural habitat of C. zugi is forest.

Description
Very large and robust for its genus, C. zugi may attain a snout-to-vent length (SVL) of almost .

Reproduction
C. zugi is oviparous.

References

Further reading
Oliver P, Tjaturadi B, Mumpuni, Krey K, Richards S (2008). "A new species of large Cyrtodactylus (Squamata: Gekkonidae) from Melanesia". Zootaxa 1894: 59–68. (Cyrtodactylus zugi, new species).

Cyrtodactylus
Reptiles described in 2008